Anthony Tyrone "Tony" Evans (born September 10, 1949) is an American Christian pastor, speaker, author, and widely syndicated radio and television broadcaster in the United States. Evans serves as senior pastor to the over-9,500-member Oak Cliff Bible Fellowship in Dallas, Texas.

Early life and education
In 1973, at the age of 24, Tony Evans was contacted by a radio show producer from Houston (KHCB). This man had contacted Dallas Theological Seminary, where Tony was a junior in the Th.M. program, asking for great preaching content to put on his program for free. One of Tony’s professors recommended him. Thus began the public broadcasting of Dr. Tony Evans. Recorded in a tiny studio on the seminary campus, Tony spent the next few years faithfully preaching into a microphone for a crowd unseen in Houston.

Nearly a decade later, The Urban Alternative was formed in 1981 when requests for Dr. Evans’ sermons came in so frequently from his Houston and Dallas radio broadcasts that Mrs. Lois Evans, co-founder of the ministry, began fulfilling orders. Mrs. Evans used her business skills to organize, develop and expand the outreach and growth of the ministry.

In 1986, Tony was invited to preach at the National Religious Broadcasters annual conference. This drew enormous attention and encouragement to expand the ministry even further.

Not too long after that appearance at NRB, radio stations began to air Dr. Evans’ program. Under the leadership of Dr. Lois Evans, Senior Vice-President of TUA, the radio ministry grew nationally and internationally. The reach of Tony’s preaching now spans the world, with his broadcasts airing on over 1,400 radio outlets and in over 130 countries, reaching millions each week.

Evans earned a BA at Carver College in 1972, a Th.M. in 1976, and a Th.D. at Dallas Theological Seminary in 1982.

Career
Evans founded the Oak Cliff Bible Fellowship in Dallas, Texas, in 1976 with 10 members meeting at his home. He also founded The Urban Alternative, a national organization that seeks to restore hope and transform lives through the proclamation and the application of the Word of God. The Urban Alternative radio broadcast, The Alternative with Dr. Tony Evans, can be heard over 1,400 outlets daily throughout the U.S. and in over 130 countries worldwide.

Evans has served as chaplain for the NFL's Dallas Cowboys and is a former NBA chaplain with the Dallas Mavericks.

He taught evangelism, homiletics, and black church studies at Dallas Theological Seminary, and serves on its Board of Incorporate Members.

Evans was named one of the 12 Most Effective Preachers in the English-Speaking World by Baylor University.

In 2017, Evans launched the Tony Evans Training Center, an online learning platform providing seminary-style courses to equip Christian leaders who cannot attend a seminary.

Evans holds the honor of writing and publishing the first full-Bible commentary and study Bible by an African American. He is also the author of over 100 books, including Oneness Embraced, The Kingdom Agenda, Kingdom Man, The Tony Evans Study Bible, and The Tony Evans Bible Commentary.

Personal life
Evans was married to his late wife Lois Irene Evans. Their marriage produced four children: Chrystal, Priscilla, Anthony Jr., and Jonathan. They also have 13 grandchildren and four great-grandchildren.

His oldest child, Chrystal Hurst, is a worship leader, Christian speaker, and writer. She co-authored the book Kingdom Woman with her father. She has also written books titled She's Still There and Show Up For Your Life.

His daughter Priscilla Shirer is a New York Times Best-Selling Author, Christian speaker, and founder of Going Beyond Ministries.

His son Anthony Jr. is a contemporary-Christian musical artist. He has collaborated with Grammy Award-winning singer Kirk Franklin and was a contestant on season two of The Voice.

Evans' son Jonathan was a professional football player in the National Football League. He played fullback for the Buffalo Bills, the Washington Redskins, and the Dallas Cowboys. Jonathan is the current chaplain of the Dallas Cowboys.

Evans is a registered Republican in Texas. In 2012 he publicly criticized President Barack Obama for his support of same-sex marriage.

References

External links
 
Oak Cliff Bible Fellowship

1949 births
Living people
20th-century African-American people
20th-century American male writers
20th-century American non-fiction writers
20th-century evangelicals
21st-century African-American people
21st-century American male writers
21st-century American non-fiction writers
21st-century evangelicals
African-American Christians
African-American Christian clergy
American evangelicals
American male non-fiction writers
Dallas Theological Seminary alumni
Evangelical pastors
Evangelical writers
Promise Keepers
Texas Republicans
Writers from Baltimore